Rancho Santa Fe is a census-designated place (CDP) in San Diego County, California, United States, within the San Diego metropolitan area. The population was 3,156 at the 2020 census. The CDP is primarily residential with a few shopping blocks, a middle and elementary school, and several restaurants.

Rancho Santa Fe borders the Fairbanks Ranch gated community to the southeast and Solana Beach to the southwest.

History

In 1906, the Santa Fe Railway, a subsidiary of the Atchison, Topeka & Santa Fe Railway, purchased the entire land grant to plant a Blue gum eucalyptus (Eucalyptus globulus) tree plantation for use as railroad ties, but the wood proved too soft to hold railroad spikes.  The railroad then formed the Santa Fe Land Improvement Company to develop a planned community of country estates, and  developed from the original Rancho San Dieguito land grant were renamed "Rancho Santa Fe" in 1922.

In 1921, architect Lilian Rice, working under Requa and Jackson, was chosen to develop the community's master plan. Rice worked through to 1927, designing, supervising, and constructing the village center, as well as several homes. The basics of the original Lilian Rice land plan are in effect to this day, and the resulting low density high green space community is unique in Southern California.

In 1923, the Santa Fe Land Company constructed a guest house called "La Morada" to house potential land purchasers. It was renamed in 1941, as "The Inn", when it was purchased by a private owner.

From 1937 to 1947, Bing Crosby hosted a golf tournament known as the "Bing Crosby Clambake" at the Rancho Santa Fe Country Club. Crosby's golf tournaments, which included Hollywood celebrities matched against professionals, drew great crowds to the area. After 1947, the tournament was moved to Monterey Peninsula, just outside San Francisco.

In 1989, "The Covenant" of Rancho Santa Fe was registered as California Historical Landmark #982 for its status as a historic planned community.

In 1996, the religious cult Heaven's Gate began renting a mansion in Rancho Santa Fe which, in March 1997, became the site of the group's mass suicide.

In 2007, the Witch Fire caused significant damage to Rancho Santa Fe, damaging or destroying over 80 homes.

Geography
Rancho Santa Fe is located at  (33.023943, -117.200110).

Climate
According to the Köppen Climate Classification system, Rancho Santa Fe has a warm-summer Mediterranean climate, abbreviated "Csa" on climate maps.

The climate of Rancho Santa Fe is, for the most part, typical of the San Diego metropolitan area though its higher elevation and inland location lends itself to larger temperature variations.

Demographics

2010
At the 2010 census Rancho Santa Fe had a population of 3,117. The racial makeup of Rancho Santa Fe was 2,910 (93.4%) White, 10 (0.3%) African American, 1 (0.0%) Native American, 87 (2.8%) Asian, 4 (0.1%) Pacific Islander, 45 (1.4%) from other races, and 60 (1.9%) from two or more races. Hispanic or Latino of any race were 176 people (5.6%).

The whole population lived in households, no one lived in non-institutionalized group quarters and no one was institutionalized.

There were 1,195 households, 364 (30.5%) had children under the age of 18 living in them, 848 (71.0%) were opposite-sex married couples living together, 62 (5.2%) had a female householder with no husband present, 33 (2.8%) had a male householder with no wife present.  There were 23 (1.9%) unmarried opposite-sex partnerships, and 9 (0.8%) same-sex married couples or partnerships. 213 households (17.8%) were one person and 124 (10.4%) had someone living alone who was 65 or older. The average household size was 2.61.  There were 943 families (78.9% of households); the average family size was 2.93.

The age distribution was 724 people (23.2%) under the age of 18, 142 people (4.6%) aged 18 to 24, 332 people (10.7%) aged 25 to 44, 1,178 people (37.8%) aged 45 to 64, and 741 people (23.8%) who were 65 or older.  The median age was 51.3 years. For every 100 females, there were 96.4 males.  For every 100 females age 18 and over, there were 93.5 males.

There were 1,391 housing units at an average density of 204.9 per square mile, of the occupied units 1,010 (84.5%) were owner-occupied and 185 (15.5%) were rented. The homeowner vacancy rate was 2.4%; the rental vacancy rate was 12.3%.  2,674 people (85.8% of the population) lived in owner-occupied housing units and 443 people (14.2%) lived in rental housing units.

The median household income was $188,859. Males had a median income of over $153,512 versus $71,667 for females. The per capita income for the CDP was $125,367. 3.2% of the population and 2.1% of families were below the poverty line. 2.3% under the age of 18 and 9.6% of those 65 and older were living below the poverty line.

2000
At the 2000 census there were 3,252 people in 1,204 households, including 947 families, in the CDP. The population density was 476.2 inhabitants per square mile (183.8/km). The racial makeup of the CDP was 93.33% White, 0.46%  African American, 0.15%  Native American, 2.77% Asian, 0.06%  Pacific Islander, 2.15% from other races, and 1.08% from two or more races. Hispanic or Latino of any race were 5.32%.

Of the 1,204 households 33.1% had children under the age of 18 living with them, 72.4% were married couples living together, 4.3% had a female householder with no husband present, and 21.3% were non-families. 17.9% of households were one person and 11.2% were one person aged 65 or older.  The average household size was 2.70 and the average family size was 3.01.

The age distribution was 25.9% under the age of 18, 2.9% from 18 to 24, 17.7% from 25 to 44, 33.0% from 45 to 64, and 20.5% 65 or older.  The median age was 47 years. For every 100 females, there were 95.2 males.  For every 100 females age 18 and over, there were 91.7 males.

The median household income was in excess of $200,000, as was the median family income . Males had a median income of over $150,000 versus $86,933 for females. The per capita income for the CDP was $113,132; and was the second wealthiest community in the United States.  3.5% of the population and 2.0% of families were below the poverty line.   4.4% under the age of 18 and 5.5% of those 65 and older was living below the poverty line.

Politics
Rancho Santa Fe is a stronghold of the Republican Party in San Diego County. In the 2008 Presidential Election, its voters chose John McCain over Barack Obama with 66.61%, significantly higher than the county-wide average of 43.79%. The community approved of California Proposition 8 with 57.57%, while Proposition 4 passed with 53.06% of the vote.

Education
Rancho Santa Fe is serviced by the following school districts:
Rancho Santa Fe Elementary School District
Solana Beach School District (Pre-K through Grade 6)
San Dieguito Union High School District (Grade 7 through Grade 12)

The public library in Rancho Santa Fe is a branch of the San Diego County Library system, and is open to all California residents.  The Rancho Santa Fe Library Guild owns the building and land that house the Rancho Santa Fe Library, as well as providing the staff for the children's room.

Notable residents

Warren Barton, former English football player
Bud Black, manager of Colorado Rockies, major league pitcher from 1981–1995, manager of San Diego Padres 2007–2015
Drew Brees, NFL quarterback, lived in Rancho Santa Fe between 2003 and 2012
Tom Chino, farmer
John H. Cox, businessman and politician
Jenny Craig, founder of Jenny Craig Inc.
Steve Finley, former major league baseball player
Taylor Fritz, professional tennis player
Bill Gates, entrepreneur, software executive, philanthropist and former chairman of Microsoft
 Jonathan Goldsmith, actor
 Gordon Hayward, professional basketball player, lived in Rancho Santa Fe between 2015 and 2020
 Charley Hoffman, professional golfer, San Diego native
 Trevor Hoffman, former professional baseball player
 Robert Herring owner of Herring Networks
 Travis Lee, former professional baseball player
 Quentin Jammer, former professional football player
Jelena Janković, Serbian professional tennis player
Kawhi Leonard, professional basketball player
Mike Love, Beach Boys singer and songwriter
Jamie Lovemark, professional golfer
Phil Mickelson, professional golfer
John Moores, philanthropist, former owner of San Diego Padres, former regent of University of California
Bill Murray, actor
Reza Pahlavi, Crown Prince of Iran
Philip Rivers, professional football player
Ace Frehley, former Kiss guitarist
Andrew Viterbi, Communication engineer, Qualcomm founder
CoCo Vandeweghe, women's tennis player.
Troy Polamalu, former professional football player
Arnold Schwarzenegger, former professional body builder, actor and governor of California (vacation home)
Richard Simmons, actor and weight loss guru
Tiger Woods, professional golfer (vacation home)

Notable former residents

Jackson D. Arnold, retired Admiral, USN
Glen Bell, founder of Taco Bell
Clair Burgener, former congressman
Bing Crosby, actor, singer
Sidney Frank, liquor promotions billionaire
Howard Hughes, business magnate, investor, aviator, aerospace engineer, film maker and philanthropist
Joan Kroc, philanthropist and widow of McDonald's founder Ray Kroc
George J. Lewis, actor, best known for playing Don Alejandro de la Vega in the 1950s television series Zorro
Victor Mature, stage, film and television actor
Patti Page, stage, film, television, recording artist
Lilian Jennette Rice, early 20th-century architect, designed The Inn and civic center of Rancho Santa Fe, plus homes that hold a historic designation
Pete Rozelle, former commissioner of the NFL
Milburn Stone, actor, "Doc Adams" on the TV series Gunsmoke
John Paxton, actor
Bill Paxton, actor

References

 
Census-designated places in San Diego County, California
North County (San Diego County)
Census-designated places in California